The M Countdown Chart is a record chart on the South Korean Mnet television music program M Countdown. Every week, the show awards the best-performing single on the chart in the country during its live broadcast.

Chart history

References 

2009 in South Korean music
2009 record charts
Lists of number-one songs in South Korea